Christina McHale and Peng Shuai were the defending champions, but Peng chose not to participate this year. McHale played alongside Lauren Davis, but lost in the first round to Kateryna Bondarenko and Alla Kudryavtseva.

Irina-Camelia Begu and Sara Errani won the title, defeating Dalila Jakupović and Nina Stojanović in the final, 6–4, 6–3.

Seeds

Draw

Draw

References 
 Draw

Tianjin Open - Doubles
Tianjin Open